Raghubar Singh was an Indian politician from the state of the Madhya Pradesh.
He represented Manendragarh Vidhan Sabha constituency of undivided Madhya Pradesh Legislative Assembly by winning General election of 1957.

References 

People from Madhya Pradesh
Madhya Pradesh MLAs 1957–1962
People from Koriya district
Year of birth missing
Year of death missing
Indian National Congress politicians from Madhya Pradesh